Jean Junior Monuma Constant Jr. (born 1 April 1982) is a Haitian footballer who currently plays as a defensive midfielder for CS Don Bosco in the Ligue Haïtienne.

Personal life
Constant Jr. is the son of Monuma Constant and Josette Nere and has a brother Fabio Testi Jr, who also played at Racing Club Haïtien before giving up football to pursue his studies. Constant Jr. is also the father to three children.

International career
Constant Jr. made his national team debut on 15 October 2010 in a FIFA World Cup qualification match against Costa Rica in a 2-0 loss. Constant Jr. scored his first international goal in a 1-0 win over Qatar on 18 November 2010. He also played in the 2013 Gold Cup.

Career statistics

International goals

References

External links
 

1982 births
Living people
Association football midfielders
Sportspeople from Port-au-Prince
Haitian footballers
Don Bosco FC players
Racing CH players
Ligue Haïtienne players
Haiti international footballers
Victory SC players
2013 CONCACAF Gold Cup players
2015 CONCACAF Gold Cup players